Fátima Idubina Rivas Opico (born on August 4, 1994) is a Salvadorian model and beauty pageant titleholder who was appointed Miss Universe El Salvador 2015 and the winner of Reinado de El Salvador in 2013. She represented her country at the Miss Universe 2015 pageant.

Personal life
Rivas is a student of Public Relations and Communications at Francisco Gavidia University. Idubina worked in 2016-2017 as TV news anchorwoman in TigoSports.

Reinado de El Salvador 2013
Rivas was crowned Reinado de El Salvador 2013 and represented her country at the Miss International 2014 pageant in Tokyo, Japan on November 11, 2014. In 2013, Rivas competed at Reina Hispanoamericana 2013, but was unplaced.

Appointment
Rivas was appointed as Miss Universe El Salvador 2015 by Liz De Castaneda (National Director of NBES). She competed at the Miss Universe 2015 pageant.

References

External links
www.nbelsalvador.com 

1994 births
Living people
Miss Universe 2015 contestants
Salvadoran beauty pageant winners
Miss El Salvador winners